Gamboola is a rural locality in the Shire of Mareeba, Queensland, Australia.

Geography
The Lynd River forms part of the western boundary.

Road infrastructure
The Burke Developmental Road (State Route 27) runs through from south-east to west.

References 

Shire of Mareeba
Localities in Queensland